Vartan (Vardan in Eastern Armenian transliteration) is an Armenian name. 

Vartan or Värtan may refer to:

Saint Vartan
Saint Vartan (full name Vardan Mamikonian, 393–451 AD), Armenian military leader, martyr and saint of the Armenian Church
St. Vartan Armenian Cathedral, Armenian Apostolic church in New York City

Vartan

Mononym
Sargis Mehrabyan, known as Commander Vartan, Armenian fedayee military commander and member of the Armenian Revolutionary Federation
Vartan Pasha (full name Hovsep Vartanian or Osep Vartanian), Ottoman Armenian statesman, author and journalist of the 19th century
Vartan Kurjian, an art director

Given name
Vartan Ghazarian (born 1969), Lebanese-Armenian footballer
Vartan Gregorian (1934–2021), Armenian-American academic
Vartan Malakian, Armenian-American artist and father of Daron Malakian, an Armenian-American musician
Vartan Matiossian (born 1964), historian, translator, editor, and teacher
Vartan Oskanian (born 1955), Armenian politician and Foreign Minister of Armenia (1998–2008) and founder of the Civilitas Foundation
Vartan Vahramian, Iranian-Armenian artist

Surname
John Vartan (1945–2004), American entrepreneur and educational philanthropist
Kaloost Vartan (1839–1908), Turkish born Armenian physician of the Nazareth Hospital, the first hospital in Ottoman Galilee
Michael Vartan (born 1968), French-American film and television actor
Neil Vartan (1962–1994), English cricketer
Sylvie Vartan (born 1944), French singer

Patronymic
Tigran Vartanovich Petrosian (1929–1984), chess grandmaster and former world chess champion

Värtan
Lilla Värtan or simply Värtan, a strait in Stockholm, Sweden
Stora Värtan, an inlet of the Baltic Sea located in the Stockholm archipelago north of the city of Stockholm, Sweden
Värtans IK, Swedish football club in Stockholm

Other uses
Vartan (comics), Italian comic book created and drawn by Sandro Angiolini
Vartan, Iran, village in Isfahan Province, Iran

See also
Bardas (disambiguation), the Hellenized form of the name
Vardan (disambiguation), another spelling of the name (usually in Eastern Armenian)
Vardanyan (disambiguation), includes Vartanian disambiguation

Armenian masculine given names